Eliyahu Meridor (20 July 1914 – 16 October 1966) was an Israeli politician who served as a member of the Knesset for Herut and Gahal from 1959 until his death in 1966.

Biography
Meridor was born Elijhu Wierzbolowski on 20 July 1914 in Saint Petersburg in the Russian Empire (now in Russia), Meridor was educated at a Tarbut school in Grajewo in Poland, before studying law at the University of Warsaw. He also became a member of the local branch of Betar. In 1936 he immigrated to Mandatory Palestine, where he worked as a lawyer. He joined the Irgun, and was a commander in Jerusalem, as well as being a member of the organisation's command. He was arrested by the British authorities and exiled to Africa.

In 1948 he was amongst the founders of the Herut movement, and chaired its Jerusalem branch. In 1959 he was elected to the Knesset on the party's list. He was re-elected in 1961 and 1965, but died in 1966 at the age of 52. His seat was taken by Shlomo Cohen-Tzidon.

Meridor had four children; Dan, also a politician, Haggit (Hurvitz), Head of Pediatrics at the Bikur Holim Hospital, Avital (Darmon), Director of the Applied Research Initiative in Education, and Sallai, former Chairman of the Jewish Agency and Israeli ambassador to the United States between 2006 and 2009. His grandchildren included Eli Hurvitz, Executive Director of the Trump Foundation, and Shaul Meridor, Deputy Director of Allocation at the Ministry of Finance.

References

External links

1914 births
1966 deaths
People from Grajewo
University of Warsaw alumni
20th-century Israeli Jews
Russian Jews
Israeli lawyers
Betar members
Irgun members
Soviet emigrants to Mandatory Palestine
Herut politicians
Gahal politicians
20th-century Israeli lawyers
Members of the 4th Knesset (1959–1961)
Members of the 5th Knesset (1961–1965)
Members of the 6th Knesset (1965–1969)